Love Is at Stake (French: L'amour est en jeu) is a 1957 French comedy drama film directed by Marc Allégret and starring Robert Lamoureux, Annie Girardot and Jacques Jouanneau.

The film's sets were designed by the art director Auguste Capelier.

Cast
 Robert Lamoureux as Robert Fayard 
 Annie Girardot as Marie-Blanche Fayard 
 Jacques Jouanneau as Damiano 
 Gabrielle Fontan as Emilie 
 Robert Rollis as Le portier 
 Pierre Doris as Le publiciste 
 Louis Massis as L'huissier 
 Leila Croft as Zizi 
 Valerie Croft as Zaza 
 Jean Parédès as De Bérimont 
 Jeanne Aubert as Mme. Brémond 
 Yves Noël as Roger Fayard

References

Bibliography 
 Oscherwitz, Dayna & Higgins, MaryEllen. The A to Z of French Cinema. Scarecrow Press, 2009.

External links 
 

1957 films
1957 comedy-drama films
French comedy-drama films
1950s French-language films
Films directed by Marc Allégret
Pathé films
1957 comedy films
1957 drama films
1950s French films